The Kartilya ng Katipunan served as the guidebook for new members of the organization, which laid out the group's rules and principles. The first edition of the Kartilya was written by Emilio Jacinto. Andrés Bonifacio later wrote a revised Decalogue. The Decalogue, originally titled Katungkulang Gagawin ng mga Z. Ll. B. (Duties of the Sons of the People), was never published because Bonifacio believed that Jacinto's Kartilya was superior to what he had made.

References

External links
 Manila Statues: Kartilya Ng Katipunan
Kartilya in Filipino. Accessed 1 September 2006.
Full text of Kartilya ng Katipunan. Published in Filipiniana.net Digital Library. Accessed on 7 January 2008.

Philippine Revolution
1890s books